The Diableros were a Canadian rock band, formed in Toronto in 2004.

History
The band was fronted by singer-songwriter Pete Carmichael. The group started after founding drummer Phoebe Lee suggested to Carmichael that they play his unheard original songs together.

In November 2005, The Diableros released their first album, You Can't Break the Strings in Our Olympic Hearts, recorded by Airfields drummer Jakob Thiesen. As an independent release, it was sold at local music shops and raised the profile of the band within Toronto. Carmichael appeared on the cover of NOW in December and a few local year-end best-of lists mentioned the band's debut.

2006 saw The Diableros garnering international acclaim when the album was re-released on The Baudelaire Label with positive reviews from Exclaim!, Pitchfork Media and Entertainment Weekly. The band toured Canada supporting The Stills in the spring with new guitarist Ian Jackson, organist Matt Rubba and bassist Gary Leggett. The album's lead track, Working Out Words, was remixed and released as a 7" single in the United Kingdom on Wi45 records. The Diableros were then selected to be the opening act on Day 2 of Toronto's first Virgin Festival. A second Canadian tour followed with Toronto's Uncut, with guitarist/bassist Ian Worang filling in as replacement for Leggett.

Much anticipation came for a second full-length album from the band. Spring 2007 was spent recording with The Hylozoists' Paul Aucoin at Halla Music in Toronto. In October, Aren't Ready for the Country was released on The Baudelaire Label. Facing multiple deaths in the family and mounting day job pressures, they completed a short tour with The Most Serene Republic in spring 2008 and decided to regroup.

Later in 2008, friends in The Postage Stamps became available to join and another lineup change ensued, featuring local promoter Keith Hamilton on bass, Mike Duffield on drums and former Stamps singer-songwriter Jordan Walsh on organ. Ian Jackson remained as long-standing guitarist.

The Diableros released a five-song EP in October 2009; titled "Old Story, Fresh Road", on Outside Music. It was produced by Juno award-winning recording engineer Laurence Currie and financially supported by the Ontario Arts Council.

Per their blogpost on MySpace on November 10, 2010, The Diableros have disbanded due to creative differences. Officially, "The Diableros are done." Guitarist Ian Jackson and organist Matt Rubba continue to play together in the indie-pop quartet, Persian Rugs. Singer-songwriter Pete Carmichael died January 22, 2020. A tweet went out January 21, 2020 reporting him missing.

Discography
You Can't Break the Strings in Our Olympic Hearts (The Baudelaire Label, 2006)
Track listing:
Working Out Words
Push it to Monday
Tropical Pets
Sugar Laced Soul
No Weight
Olympic Island
Through the Foam
Smash the Clock
Golden Gates

Aren't Ready for the Country (The Baudelaire Label, 2007)
Track listing:
Up in the Mountain Range
Ever-changing
Nothing Down in Hogtown
Any Other Time
Turning Backwards
Mist
Telepathic Love
Kicking Rocks
Left From the Movies
No One Wants to Drive
Broken Barns

Old Story, Fresh Road (Outside Music, 2009)
Track listing:
Wandering Dry
Quell the Cold
Heavy Hands
When the Water Rises
Old Story, Fresh Road

See also

Music of Canada
Canadian rock
List of Canadian musicians
List of bands from Canada
:Category:Canadian musical groups

References

Musical groups established in 2004
Canadian indie rock groups
Musical groups from Toronto
Musical groups disestablished in 2010
2004 establishments in Ontario
2010 disestablishments in Ontario